InfoMás (better known as Spectrum InfoMás as of September 24, 2017) was an American Spanish-language cable news television channel owned by Charter Communications through its acquisition of Bright House Networks in May 2016. The channel provided 24-hour rolling news coverage focused on the Tampa Bay Area and Central Florida. The channel was carried on Charter Spectrum digital channel 900 and in high definition on digital channel 1900.

On October 31, 2017, Charter announced that the network would be shut down within the month of November, as they claimed that Hispanic viewers gravitated towards the traditional English news coverage of Bay News 9 in Tampa and News 13 in Orlando. Most of the existing InfoMás staff were let go. The channel ceased operations on November 20, 2017, and it now says "Este canal ha dejado de estar operativo." ("This channel is no longer in operation.")

History
The channel traced its history to the launches of two separate Spanish language news channels owned by the former Bright House Networks. In Fall 2001, then Bay News 9 General Manager Elliott Wiser announced the creation of a local Spanish news channel. Bay News 9 en Espanol launched in March 2002. It provided news coverage and other news content focused the Tampa Bay area's Hispanic community. It was the first local news channel in the United States to provide local news and weather segments in Spanish 24 hours a day. The success of Bay News 9 En Español, Bright House launched a Spanish-language spin-off of its Orlando-based news channel Central Florida News 13, Central Florida News 13 en Español, in December 2006.

On March 11, 2011, Bright House Networks announced it would merge Bay News 9 and Central Florida News 13's respective Spanish-language news channels into a single regional news channel called InfoMás, which would produce regional newscasts focused on the Tampa and Orlando areas with reports and political coverage from both areas; plans also called for the launch of a talk show produced out of News 13's Orlando studios, Spanish language broadcasts of professional baseball and basketball games. The channel formally launched on July 12, 2011. The channel maintained reporters based in both Tampa Bay and Central Florida.

Programming
Like its English language counterparts, InfoMás covered local, national and international news stories, weather forecasts, entertainment and health stories, and sports; weather segments on the channel also incorporated weather forecasts for South America, the Caribbean and Mexico.

The channel also produced Revista InfoMás, a half-hour weekday magazine program covering politics, immigration, education and other news subjects that affect the Hispanic and Latin American community residing in the central third of Florida. In lieu of a Spanish-language regional sports network in either of the two markets that InfoMás serves, the channel also carried sporting events including NBA games from the Orlando Magic, and Major League Baseball games from the Tampa Bay Rays and the Miami Marlins; game telecasts feature commentary and analysis in Spanish.

Notable former on-air staff
 Carleth Keys – anchor/managing editor (2002–06)

See also
 Bay News 9 - a similar 24-hour regional cable news channel for the Tampa Bay Area operated by Charter Communications
 News 13 - a similar 24-hour regional cable news channel for the Orlando area operated by Charter Communications

References

External links
 
 www.baynews9.com/infomas - InfoMás page on Bay News 9 website
 www.mynews13.com/infomas - InfoMás page on News 13 website

Charter Communications
Spanish-language television networks in the United States
24-hour television news channels in the United States
Defunct television networks in the United States
Advance Publications
Television stations in the Tampa Bay area
2011 establishments in Florida
2017 disestablishments in Florida
Television channels and stations established in 2011
Television channels and stations disestablished in 2017